Christy Smith (née Fisher, born 1969) is an American politician who was the California State Assemblywoman for the 38th district from 2018 until 2020. A member of the Democratic Party, Smith ran three unsuccessful campaigns for California's 25th congressional district, losing all three to Republican Mike Garcia.

Early life, education, and career
Smith was born in a U.S. Army hospital in 1969 in Würzburg, West Germany (now Germany). Her parents returned to the United States when she was six months old, settling in Fortville, Indiana, where her father, Jerry Fisher, found work at RCA Records. They later moved to Terre Haute before finally settling down in the Santa Clarita Valley in 1979. The eldest of three children, she graduated from William S. Hart High School in Santa Clarita and attended College of the Canyons. She received her Bachelor of Arts in political science from University of California, Los Angeles in 1993. Smith then worked for the United States Department of Education as a policy analyst during the Clinton administration. She has served two terms on the board of the Newhall School District.

California State Assembly

In 2016, Smith ran in California's 38th State Assembly district. The seat was open after Republican incumbent Scott Wilk decided to run for State Senate. Although she led the candidate field in the open primary in June, she eventually lost to Republican Santa Clarita City Councilman Dante Acosta, 52.87% to 47.13%, in the November general election.

In 2018, she ran again for the 38th district against Acosta and won 51.2% to Acosta's 48.8%.

She chaired the Joint Legislative Committee on Emergency Management.

California's 25th congressional district elections

2020 special and general 

On October 28, 2019, one day after Katie Hill announced her intent to resign  from Congress, Smith announced her bid to fill Hill's vacated congressional seat. Hill endorsed Smith as her successor. Smith's State Assembly district covers more than half of the congressional district.

Smith picked up endorsements from the Los Angeles Times, Indivisible, and prominent Democratic figures such as House Speaker Nancy Pelosi, U.S. Senators Dianne Feinstein and Kamala Harris, and Governor Gavin Newsom.

Smith's eleven opponents in the March 3, 2020, primary election included former U.S. Representative Steve Knight, progressive political commentator Cenk Uygur, and foreign policy adviser for Donald Trump's 2016 campaign George Papadopoulos. In December 2019, EMILY's List endorsed Smith, as did the Democratic Congressional Campaign Committee the following month.

Smith declined to attend a Democratic primary debate held on January 9, 2020, in Palmdale, California, citing her legislative duties in the State Assembly.

On March 3, 2020, a primary for the special election was held to fill the remainder of Hill's term at the same time that a primary election for the 117th United States Congress took place. Smith finished first in both elections. On May 12, 2020, a runoff was conducted to fill the remainder of Hill's term, which she lost to Republican Mike Garcia, a former U.S. Navy pilot. In the general election on November 3, 2020, she faced Garcia again, this time losing by 333 votes for the full two-year congressional term.

2022 

In May 2021, Smith announced her intent to run a third time for what is now California's 27th congressional seat. In the November 8, 2022, election she lost again to Garcia.

Personal life 
Smith lives in Santa Clarita, California, with her husband, Phil, and their two daughters.

Electoral history

California State Assembly

2016

2018

U.S. House of Representatives

2020 special

2020 general

References

External links

 Christy Smith for U.S. Congress campaign website
 

1969 births
21st-century American women politicians
21st-century American politicians
Candidates in the 2022 United States House of Representatives elections
College of the Canyons alumni
Living people
Democratic Party members of the California State Assembly
People from Terre Haute, Indiana
People from Santa Clarita, California
School board members in California
University of California, Los Angeles alumni
Women state legislators in California